Amanda McGrory (born June 9, 1986) is an American wheelchair athlete.

Biography
McGrory graduated from Unionville High School in Kennett Square, Pennsylvania.
She attended the University of Illinois, graduating in 2010 with a bachelor's degree in psychology and in 2018 with a masters in information science. While an undergraduate she competed both in basketball and in track and field.

McGrory earned four medals during the 2008 Summer Paralympics in Beijing, China: gold in the 5000 meters, silver in the marathon, and bronze in both the 800 meters and the 4×100 meter relay. She won both the 2009 London and 2006 New York Marathon wheelchair races.

She has also competed in the World Championships for Track and Field (2006, 2011, 2013, 2015, 2017) and Marathon (2015), winning 10 medals over the years (3 gold, 3 silver, 4 bronze).

McGrory was diagnosed with transverse myelitis when she was five years old, after an allergy shot inflamed her spinal cord. Such an occurrence was "I think there was one chance in six million," she said. "But I think it's usually better when you are young because kids are resilient. I couldn't ride a two-wheeler anymore, but my friends could still be outside. But I was the coolest kid in school because I had a wheelchair."

Selected results

 2011: First Place- New York City Marathon
 2011: First Place- London Marathon
 2009: First Place- London Marathon
 2009: First place- Grandma's Marathon
 2008: Gold medal, 5000m T54; silver medal, Marathon T54; bronze medal, 800m T53; bronze medal, Women's 4 x 100m relay T53/T54 - Paralympic Games, Beijing, China
 2007:  First place (5000m), second place (400m), third place (800m) - Meet in the Heat, Atlanta, GA.
 2007:  Third place, 1500m - Boiling Point Wheelchair Track Classic, Windsor, Ontario, Canada
 2007:  Third place, 800m - U.S. Paralympics Track & Field National Championships, Atlanta, GA.
 2007:  First place - Open Women's Division of the Shepherd Center Wheelchair Division of the AJC Peachtree Road Race in Atlanta, Georgia with the time of 23:11:05.
 2006:  Gold medal (800m), silver medal (400m) - IPC Athletics World Championships, Assen, Netherlands
 2006:  First place - ING New York City Marathon, New York City, NY
 2006:  Visa Paralympic World Cup, Manchester, United Kingdom
 2005:  Represented the US at the Jr. Pan-Am Games in Windsor, Ontario
 2003, 2004:  Traveled to Australia as a member of the USA Jr. Team

 2010 Los Angeles Marathon: 1:53:12, first
 2012 Summer Paralympics
 800 m T53: 1:54.48, 7th
 1500 m T54: 3:38.19, 7th
 5000 m T54: 12:29.07, 7th
 Marathon T54: 1:46:35, 4th
 2013 Boston Marathon: 1:49:19, third
2016 Rio Paralympic Games, silver (1500m, 5000m), bronze (marathon), 4th (800m)

References

External links
 
 
 USA Paralympic Team Profile

1986 births
Living people
People with paraplegia
American female wheelchair racers
Illinois Fighting Illini Paralympic athletes
Paralympic track and field athletes of the United States
Athletes (track and field) at the 2008 Summer Paralympics
Athletes (track and field) at the 2012 Summer Paralympics
Athletes (track and field) at the 2016 Summer Paralympics
Paralympic gold medalists for the United States
Paralympic silver medalists for the United States
Paralympic bronze medalists for the United States
People from Kennett Square, Pennsylvania
Sportspeople from Chester County, Pennsylvania
Track and field athletes from Pennsylvania
Paralympic wheelchair racers
Medalists at the 2008 Summer Paralympics
Medalists at the 2016 Summer Paralympics
Paralympic medalists in athletics (track and field)
Athletes (track and field) at the 2020 Summer Paralympics
21st-century American women